Joshua Emile Doherty Urbiztondo (born February 27, 1983) is a Filipino-American former professional basketball player. He last played for the San Miguel Alab Pilipinas of the ASEAN Basketball League (ABL).

Amateur career 
Urbiztondo played for Fresno-Pacific University in his final years of college. It was there where he gained a reputation as a scorer.

In the summer of 2008, Urbiztondo left the States to play in the PBA D-League. There, he led his team to a championship victory, got named to the "Top Five Mythical Team", was named Top Defensive Player, was the consensus number one performer, and was poised to be a high pick in the upcoming PBA Draft.

PBA career

Sta. Lucia Realtors 
In 2009, Urbiztondo entered the draft for the PBA, but was not selected. He was later signed by the Sta. Lucia Realtors. In 2010, the Realtors were replaced by the Meralco Bolts. In August 2010, the newly founded team gave away Urbiztondo and its number 3 pick in the 2010 PBA draft to the Air21 Express, in a three-way deal that brought Mark Cardona to the Bolts.

Air 21 Express 
In 2011, he earned the nickname "Fireball" after going for 31 points in a game while playing for Air21.

B-Meg Llamados 
In 2011 Urbiztondo was signed by the B-Meg Llamados. He competed in the three-point shootout during the 2012 All-Star Weekend (losing to Mark Macapagal) and was named an All-Star that year. During the 2012 Commissioner's Cup Finals, he was fined 2,400 pesos for exchanging elbows with Pamboy Raymundo. The Llamados eventually won the series, giving him his only PBA title.  Later that year, that team was renamed as the San Mig Coffee Mixers, who then sent him to the Barako Bull Energy Cola in exchange for a first round pick in the next year.

Barako Bull Energy Cola 
He suffered a hamstring injury in his time there. He won a Player of the Week award before he was traded to Ginebra.

Barangay Ginebra San Miguel 
In 2013, prior to the Commissioner's Cup playoffs, Urbiztondo was dealt to Barangay Ginebra San Miguel.

In 2014, he missed some games due to a back spasm.

On August 25, 2015, he along with Jens Knuttel was traded to the Barako Bull Energy for Nico Salva and a future first round pick.

Return to Barako Bull franchise 
In a game against the Bolts during the 2015-16 Philippine Cup, Urbiztondo scored 13 of his 24 points in the fourth quarter to give Barako Bull the win. He also had 3 rebounds, 3 steals, and 2 assists in that game. Before the start of the 2016-17 season, he, along with young point guard Mark Cruz, were released from the team.

Globalport Batang Pier 
Urbiztondo was then signed by the Globalport Batang Pier, who had to relegate Karl Dehesa to the reserve list to make room for him. He played in only eight games for them in the Philippine Cup before being released.

After the ABL season, Urbiztondo was signed once again by Globalport, who needed his services after loaning Terrence Romeo to the national team. This would be his last time playing for a PBA team.

ABL career

Singapore Slingers 
After his first stint with Globalport, Urbiztondo became the Heritage Import of the Singapore Slingers. The Slingers made it to the 2017 Finals. In Game 1, he hit a Finals-record seven three-pointers, breaking the previous record of five. He had 23 points in that game, and the Slingers won that game. But then they lost the next three games, and the Hong Kong Eastern Long Lions won the championship.

Alab Pilipinas 
Urbiztondo returned to the ABL to play for Alab Pilipinas, which he had defeated in the semis the previous year. His team won the 2017–18 title over the Mono Vampire. The team failed to defend the title the following season, losing to the Hong Kong Eastern Basketball in the quarterfinals. At the end of that season, Urbiztondo announced his retirement from basketball.

Personal life 
His father is Filipino and his mother is American. He is currently an assistant coach for the high school basketball team of San Joaquin Memorial.

PBA career statistics

Season-by-season averages
Correct as of February 19, 2022

|-
| align=left | 
| align=left | Sta. Lucia
| 37 || 21.8 || .368 || .308 || .809 || 2.8 || 2.6 || 1.1 || .0 || 7.8
|-
| align=left | 
| align=left | Air21
| 43 || 17.6 || .387 || .362 || .838 || 2.6 || 3.1 || .5 || .1 || 6.1
|-
| align=left | 
| align=left | B-Meg
| 62 || 25.8 || .397 || .321 || .653 || 3.3 || 2.9 || .9 || .0 || 6.9
|-
| align=left | 
| align=left | Barako Bull / Barangay Ginebra
| 44 || 25.2 || .342 || .323 || .674 || 2.8 || 3.7 || 1.1 || .0 || 8.3
|-
| align=left | 
| align=left | Barangay Ginebra
| 29 || 10.6 || .337 || .292 || .333 || 1.4 || .7 || .5 || .0 || 2.9
|-
| align=left | 
| align=left | Barangay Ginebra
| 23 || 13.0 || .330 || .298 || .923 || 2.0 || 1.4 || 1.1 || .0 || 4.0
|-
| align=left | 
| align=left | Barako Bull / Phoenix
| 32 || 19.5 || .367 || .370 || .651 || 2.0 || 2.1 || .8 || .1 || 9.4
|-
| align=left | 
| align=left | GlobalPort
| 9 || 7.8 || .150 || .214 || .000 || .9 || 1.0 || .4 || .0 || 1.0
|-class=sortbottom
| align=center colspan=2 | Career
| 279 || 20.0 || .365 || .328 || .715 || 2.5 || 2.5 || .9 || .0 || 6.6

ABL career statistics

Season-by-season averages

|-
| align=left | 2016–17
| align=left | Singapore Slingers
| 10 || 28.2 || .36 || .35 || .85 || 4.5 || 2.6 || .7 || .0 || 11.3
|-
| align=left | 2017–18
| align=left | San Miguel Alab Pilipinas
| 26 || 22.8 || .41 || .41 || .88 || 3.4 || 2.8 || .9 || .0 || 8.2
|-
| align=left | 2018–19
| align=left | San Miguel Alab Pilipinas
| 28 || 16.3 || .37 || .35 || .80 || 3.0 || 2.4 || .7 || .0 || 5.4
|-

References

External links
 Player Profile at PBA-Online!

1983 births
Living people
American sportspeople of Filipino descent
Barako Bull Energy players
Barangay Ginebra San Miguel players
Basketball players from San Francisco
Expatriate sportspeople in Singapore
Filipino expatriate basketball people in Singapore
Filipino men's basketball players
Foothill College alumni
Fresno Pacific Sunbirds men's basketball players
NorthPort Batang Pier players
Junior college men's basketball players in the United States
Magnolia Hotshots players
Philippine Basketball Association All-Stars
Phoenix Super LPG Fuel Masters players
Point guards
San Miguel Alab Pilipinas players
Shooting guards
Singapore Slingers players
Sta. Lucia Realtors players
American men's basketball players
Citizens of the Philippines through descent